Neosqualodon is an extinct genus of toothed cetacean, that lived in the Middle Miocene (Langhian) in what is now Italy. Their fossils - mostly teeth and jaws that are more robust and shorter than in the related genus Squalodon - have been recovered in the Ragusa Formation of Sicily. Two species are known: N. assenzae and N. gemellaroi, that are distinguished by the shape of the teeth. Apparently this genus was endemic to the pre-Mediterranean sea of the Late Oligocene.

References

Miocene cetaceans
Prehistoric toothed whales
Prehistoric cetacean genera
Fossil taxa described in 1904
Fossils of Italy